Yinchuan railway station is the main railway station of Yinchuan, the capital of China's Ningxia province. The station was opened in 1958. In 1988, a new station building was inaugurated, which was replaced in 2011 by a building on the opposite (eastern) side of the platforms.

References

Stations on the Longhai Railway
Railway stations in Ningxia
Railway stations in China opened in 1958
Transport in Ningxia